Judy is a 2019 biographical drama film based on the life of American actress Judy Garland. Directed by Rupert Goold, it is an adaptation of the Olivier- and Tony-nominated West End and Broadway play End of the Rainbow by Peter Quilter. The film stars Renée Zellweger, Jessie Buckley, Finn Wittrock, Rufus Sewell, and Michael Gambon.

The film follows Garland's career during the last year of her life, when she relocated her stage career to England, coupled with flashbacks of her childhood, most prominently the filming of her part as Dorothy Gale in The Wizard of Oz, her most famous role. After some initial success in a run of sell-out concerts at the Talk of the Town in London, her efforts eventually stop making progress and even start to worsen as her health deteriorates.

Judy premiered at the 46th Telluride Film Festival on 30 August 2019, and was released in the United States on 27 September 2019, and in the United Kingdom on 2 October 2019. The film received generally positive reviews, with Zellweger's performance garnering widespread acclaim. For her portrayal of Garland, Zellweger won the Academy Award for Best Actress, as well as the Golden Globe Award, SAG Award, BAFTA Award and Critics' Choice Movie Award.

Plot
In the 1930s, 16-year-old child actress Judy Garland is told by Metro-Goldwyn-Mayer studio head, Louis B. Mayer on the set of The Wizard of Oz, that she has a gift other girls do not. Her talent at singing is nearly unmatched while she is able to surpass the success of Shirley Temple as a Hollywood child star. As Judy's career takes off, a ruthless studio minder forces Judy to take amphetamines against her will, once such instance occurs during her date with Mickey Rooney. Judy is even denied permission for her to sleep due to the demanding schedule. Responding to Judy's criticisms, Mayer explains that she is exhausted by her working hours; even using emotional and physical intimidation to keep her in line.

In her forties, Judy has been performing with Lorna and Joey, her two children from her marriage to Sidney Luft, her third husband. Later, the trio try to check into their hotel but are turned away for previous nonpayment. Because of this, Judy is forced to return home to Luft, who has since divorced her.

At a party, Judy meets Mickey Deans, a nightclub owner, and they become friends. In 1968, Judy is told by her agent of England being free to host her upcoming performances, but that the US reception to her has cooled due to her performance unreliability and moodiness. She decides to embark for there, leaving Lorna and Joey with Luft, which is difficult for her.

While in England, substance abuse keeps Judy from performing reliably. She is late to her London premiere and assistants are called upon to check on her health and fix her make-up. The fans are enthusiastic and her performance is excellent. During the show, she starts to sing the "Clang, clang, clang..." lyrics to "The Trolley Song" to loud applause.

Judy meets two adoring gay fans at the stage door on her way out and joins them for a late-night snack at their flat. They bond over their difficulties, and she sings "Get Happy" while one of the fans plays the piano. Deans comes to London on a surprise visit, which cheers her up. She still has trouble making her stage performances on time because of substance abuse and anxiety.

Judy's sponsoring British agent has her examined by a voice specialist doctor. She says she had a tracheotomy two years ago, which weakened her voice. The doctor diagnoses physical and mental exhaustion, which requires rest for recovery. Her relationship with Deans is a support to her personal life, and they marry, making him her fifth husband. She still thinks about Lorna and Joey and suffers from being separated from them. They, however, are happy in school in California. Deans has bad news about a money deal that fell through, which means she must stay in England to make ends meet. At her next performance, she passes out on stage and is heckled. Her singing engagement is terminated but she returns for a last night on stage, where she asks to perform one last song. She breaks down while singing "Over the Rainbow" but recovers with the encouragement of supportive fans and is able to complete the performance. She asks, "You won't forget me, will you?" to the audience, who applaud before she ends her performance by saying, "Promise you won't". The film's end card says she died six months later, in summer 1969, at the age of 47.

Cast

Production
Principal photography began on 19 March 2018, in London. Filming locations included West London Film Studios. Pinewood Studios, and Hackney Empire.

Release
The film had its world premiere at the Telluride Film Festival on 30 August 2019. It also screened at the Toronto International Film Festival on 10 September 2019. It was theatrically released in the United States on 27 September 2019, by Roadside Attractions and LD Entertainment, and in the United Kingdom on 2 October 2019, by 20th Century Fox, Pathé's British Distributor.

Music

The soundtrack for the film was released on 28 September 2019 by Decca Records. It features twelve of Garland's most popular tracks performed by Zellweger, including several that were featured in the movie, as well as duets with Sam Smith and Rufus Wainwright.

Reception

Box office
The film grossed $24.3 million in the United States and Canada, and $18.9 million in other territories, for a worldwide total of $43.2 million.

The film made $2.9 million in its opening weekend, from 461 theatres, finishing seventh at the box office; 60% of its audiences was female, while 79% were over the age of 35. It expanded to 1,458 theatres the following weekend and made $4.6 million, finishing sixth, before making $3.2 million in its third weekend, returning to seventh place.

Critical response

The website's consensus reads, "Led by a deeply committed performance from Renée Zellweger, Judy captures the waning days of a beloved performer with clear-eyed compassion." On Metacritic, it has a weighted average score of 66 out of 100, based on 46 critics, indicating "generally favorable reviews." Audiences polled by CinemaScore gave it an average grade of "A−" on an A+ to F scale.

Zellweger garnered much critical acclaim for her performance in the title role, with several critics labelling her a frontrunner to win the Academy Award for Best Actress, which she would later go on to win. Peter Travers of Rolling Stone called her portrayal of Garland "the performance of the year," while Zoe Gahan of Vanity Fair wrote, "a stellar stage-stomping performance. It is hard to tell where Garland stops and Zellweger starts...Go and see this film. Laugh and weep, bawl your eyes out—she deserves every tear." Eric Kohn of IndieWire gave the film a "C", stating that "Zellweger inhabits the role of the jaded, soul-searching musical icon reasonably well within a dreary and unremarkable saga that finds her grappling with her past, contending with pill-popping addictions and a broken family. It's a familiar story that Judy struggles to freshen up, at least until Zellweger takes the mic."

Monica Castillo of RogerEbert.com gave the film two out of four stars; though she praised how it contextualized Garland's abusive childhood, she criticized Goold's direction and Zellweger's performance, stating that "there are spots in the movie where Zellweger's affected manners become too distracting and overshadow everything else around her...Try as she might, Zellweger's Judy never goes beyond an impression of the multi-talented artist; her all-caps version of acting fails to allow the role to feel natural."

Accolades

References

External links
 
 
 Official webpage of the play End of the Rainbow

2019 films
2019 biographical drama films
2019 independent films
20th Century Fox films
American biographical drama films
American films based on plays
BAFTA winners (films)
BBC Film films
Biographical films about actors
Biographical films about singers
British biographical drama films
British films based on plays
Cultural depictions of actors
Cultural depictions of Judy Garland
Films scored by Gabriel Yared
Drama films based on actual events
Films about alcoholism
Films about drugs
Films featuring a Best Actress Academy Award-winning performance
Films featuring a Best Drama Actress Golden Globe-winning performance
Films set in London
Films set in Los Angeles
Films set in the 1930s
Films set in the 1960s
Films set in 1969
Films shot in London
Pathé films
Roadside Attractions films
Scanbox Entertainment films
2019 drama films
Films directed by Rupert Goold
Films about actors
Films shot at Pinewood Studios
2010s English-language films
2010s American films
2010s British films